Outlook is a Canadian short film television series which aired on CBC Television in 1966.

Premise
This series featured short films from sources such as the BBC and the National Film Board of Canada. Some of these included:

 "The End of Summer" (Michel Brault director)
 "Fabienne" (Jacques Godbout)
 "Stampede" (Claude Fournier director), featuring the Calgary Stampede
 "They Called It Fireproof" (Roger Blais director) concerning building safety
 "Toronto Jazz" (Don Owen)
 "You're No Good" (Jean Roy director)

Scheduling
This half-hour series was broadcast Fridays at 5:30 p.m. from 8 July to 30 September 1966.

References

External links
 

CBC Television original programming
1966 Canadian television series debuts
1966 Canadian television series endings